The Weingarten Manuscript (German Weingartner Liederhandschrift) is a 14th-century illuminated manuscript containing a collection of Minnesang lyrics. It is currently in the Württembergische Landesbibliothek, Stuttgart, with the shelf-mark HB XIII 1.  In Minnesang scholarship it is referred to as Manuscript B.

Along with the Codex Manesse (MS. C) and the Kleine Heidelberger Liederhandschrift (MS. A) it is one of the major sources of Minnesang texts from the beginnings (around 1150) to the end of the "golden age" (around 1230).

Description
The manuscript comprises 158 folios and is 15cm×11.5cm in size, the small size suggesting that it was for private use. It contains collections of lyrics by 31 poets: 25 are named Minnesänger and the other six are not named, but the authors are identifiable from texts preserved in other MSS. The MS. contains miniatures of the 25 named Minnesänger, two half-page, the rest full-page.

Most of the poems are love lyrics but among the anonymous material are a poem in praise of the virgin ("Marienlob"), and the "Minnelehre" ("Art of Love") of Johann von Konstanz.

The ordering of the poets broadly reflects their place in the social hierarchy, starting with the Emperor Henry VI, followed by the counts and then other knights.

History
The manuscript was written in the first quarter of the 14th Century, possibly in Konstanz. Similarities between the Weingarten MS. and the Codex Manesse in both the texts and the ordering of material imply that they share a common source, now lost.

The MS. is thought to have belonged to the Cathedral Library in Konstanz and the commissioning patron is commonly taken to be Heinrich von Klingenberg, Bishop of Konstanz 1293–1306.

Poets

The manuscript includes the following Minnesänger:

Notes

References

External links
 Facsimile

14th-century illuminated manuscripts
Middle High German literature
Middle High German manuscripts
Minnesang
Literary illuminated manuscripts
Poetry anthologies